Do Diwane (Two Rogues) also known as Be Kharab Jaan, is a 1936 Hindi comedy film directed by Chimanlal Luhar based on K. M. Munshi's famous play Be Kharab Jaan. The film was produced by Sagar Movietone and had music composed by Pransukh Nayak with cinematography by Keki Mistry. The cast included Shobhana Samarth, Motilal, Yakub, Aruna Devi, Rama Devi, Kamalabai, Kayam Ali, Pande and Pesi Patel.

Based on the famous Gujarati language writer K.M. Munshi's "acclaimed comedy", the film dealt with the traditional values of the older generation in conflict with the western values adopted by the youngsters.

Plot
Motilal in the role of a doctor, wants to join the revolutionaries along with his girlfriend played by Shobhana Samarth. Both are opposed by their parents. The parents find it difficult to come to terms with what they consider as 'western influences' on their children in clothes and thinking. Several humorous situations arise in the process with everything finally ending to the satisfaction of both generations.

Cast
 Shobhana Samarth
 Motilal
 Yakub
 Rama Devi
 Aruna Devi
 Kamala Devi
 Kayam Ali
 Pande
 Temuras
 Pesi Patel
 Mehndi Raza
 Kantilal Nayak

Shobhana Samarth and Motilal
Shobhana Samarth started her career after marriage with Nigah-e-Nafrat (1935), but Do Diwane was the first film to have the popular pair of Shobhana Samarth and Motilal starring together and it was cited as one of her best films.  She came into prominence with her roles in two of Sagar Movietone films, Do Diwane and Kokila (1937) both with Motilal.

Music
The music was composed by Pransukh M. Naik with lyrics written by Raghunath Brahmbhatt.  The singers were Motilal, Shobhana Samarth and Kamala Devi.

Song List

References

External links

1936 films
1930s Hindi-language films
Indian films based on plays
Indian comedy films
1936 comedy films
Indian black-and-white films
Hindi-language comedy films